Coal tar is a thick dark liquid which is a by-product of the production of coke and coal gas from coal. It is a type of creosote. It has both medical and industrial uses. Medicinally it is a topical medication applied to skin to treat psoriasis and seborrheic dermatitis (dandruff). It may be used in combination with ultraviolet light therapy. Industrially it is a railroad tie preservative and used in the surfacing of roads. Coal tar was listed as a known human carcinogen in the first Report on Carcinogens from the U.S. Federal Government.

Coal tar was discovered circa 1665 and used for medical purposes as early as the 1800s. Circa 1850, the discovery that it could be used as the main raw material for the synthesis of dyes engendered an entire industry. It is on the World Health Organization's List of Essential Medicines. Coal tar is available as a generic medication and over the counter.

Side effects include skin irritation, sun sensitivity, allergic reactions, and skin discoloration. It is unclear if use during pregnancy is safe for the baby and use during breastfeeding is not typically recommended. The exact mechanism of action is unknown. It is a complex mixture of phenols, polycyclic aromatic hydrocarbons (PAHs), and heterocyclic compounds. It demonstrates antifungal, anti-inflammatory, anti-itch, and antiparasitic  properties.

Uses

Medicine 
Coal tar is used in medicated shampoo, soap and ointment. It demonstrates antifungal, anti-inflammatory, anti-itch, and antiparasitic properties. It may be applied topically as a treatment for dandruff and psoriasis, and to kill and repel head lice. It may be used in combination with ultraviolet light therapy.

Coal tar may be used in two forms: crude coal tar or a coal tar solution also known as liquor carbonis detergens (LCD).  Named brands include Denorex, Balnetar, Psoriasin, Tegrin, T/Gel, and Neutar. When used in the extemporaneous preparation of topical medications, it is supplied in the form of coal tar topical solution USP, which consists of a 20% w/v solution of coal tar in alcohol, with an additional 5% w/v of polysorbate 80 USP; this must then be diluted in an ointment base such as petrolatum.

Construction 

Coal tar was a component of the first sealed roads. In its original development by Edgar Purnell Hooley, tarmac was tar covered with granite chips. Later the filler used was industrial slag. Today, petroleum derived binders and sealers are more commonly used. These sealers are used to extend the life and reduce maintenance cost associated with asphalt pavements, primarily in asphalt road paving, car parks and walkways.

Coal tar is incorporated into some parking-lot sealcoat products used to protect the structural integrity of the underlying pavement. Sealcoat products that are coal-tar based typically contain 20 to 35 percent coal-tar pitch. Research shows it is used throughout the United States of America, however several areas have banned its use in sealcoat products,
 including the District of Columbia; the city of Austin, Texas; Dane County, Wisconsin; the state of Washington; and several municipalities in Minnesota and others.

Industry 
Being flammable, coal tar is sometimes used for heating or to fire boilers. Like most heavy oils, it must be heated before it will flow easily.

A large part of the binder used in the graphite industry for making "green blocks" is coke oven volatiles (COV), a considerable portion of which is coal tar. During the baking process of the green blocks as a part of commercial graphite production, most of the coal tar binders are vaporised and are generally burned in an incinerator to prevent release into the atmosphere, as COV and coal tar can be injurious to health.

Coal tar is also used to manufacture paints, synthetic dyes (notably tartrazine/Yellow #5), and photographic materials.

In the coal gas era, there were many companies in Britain whose business was to distill coal tar to separate the higher-value fractions, such as naphtha, creosote and pitch. Many industrial chemicals were first isolated from coal tar during this time. These companies included:

 Bonnington Chemical Works
 British Tar Products
 Lancashire Tar Distillers
 Midland Tar Distillers
 Newton, Chambers & Company (owners of Izal brand disinfectant)
 Sadlers Chemicals

In modern times, coal tar is mostly traded as fuel and an application for tar, such as roofing. The total value of the trade in coal tar is around US$20 billion each year.

Safety 
Side effects of coal tar products include skin irritation, sun sensitivity, allergic reactions, and skin discoloration. It is unclear if use during pregnancy is safe for the baby and use during breastfeeding is not typically recommended.

According to the National Psoriasis Foundation, coal tar is a valuable, safe and inexpensive treatment option for millions of people with psoriasis and other scalp or skin conditions. According to the FDA, coal tar concentrations between 0.5% and 5% are considered safe and effective for psoriasis.

Cancer 
Long-term, consistent exposure to coal tar likely increases the risk of non-melanoma skin cancers.  Evidence is inconclusive whether medical coal tar, which does not remain on the skin for the long periods seen in occupational exposure, causes cancer, because there is insufficient data to make a judgment. While coal tar consistently causes cancer in cohorts of workers with chronic occupational exposure, animal models, and mechanistic studies, the data on short-term use as medicine in humans has so far failed to show any consistently significant increase in rates of cancer.

Coal tar contains many polycyclic aromatic hydrocarbons, and it is believed that their metabolites bind to DNA, damaging it. The PAHs found in coal tar and air pollution induce immunosenescence and cytotoxicity in epidermal cells. It's possible that the skin can repair itself from this damage after short-term exposure to PAHs but not after long-term exposure. Long-term skin exposure to these compounds can produce "tar warts", which can progress to squamous cell carcinoma.

Coal tar was one of the first chemical substances proven to cause cancer from occupational exposure, during research in 1775 on the cause of chimney sweeps' carcinoma. Modern studies have shown that working with coal tar pitch, such as during the paving of roads or when working on roofs, increases the risk of cancer.

The International Agency for Research on Cancer lists coal tars as Group 1 carcinogens, meaning they directly cause cancer. The U.S. Department of Health and Human Services lists coal tars as known human carcinogens.

In response to public health concerns regarding the carcinogenicity of PAHs some municipalities, such as the city of Milwaukee, have banned the use of common coal tar-based road and driveway sealants citing concerns of elevated PAH content in groundwater.

Other 
Coal tar causes increased sensitivity to sunlight, so skin treated with topical coal tar preparations should be protected from sunlight.

The residue from the distillation of high-temperature coal tar, primarily a complex mixture of three or more membered condensed ring aromatic hydrocarbons, was listed on 13 January 2010 as a substance of very high concern by the European Chemicals Agency.

Mechanism of action 
The exact mechanism of action is unknown. Coal tar is a complex mixture of phenols, polycyclic aromatic hydrocarbons (PAHs), and heterocyclic compounds.

It is a keratolytic agent, which reduces the growth rate of skin cells and softens the skin's keratin.

Composition 
Coal tar is produced through thermal destruction (pyrolysis) of coal. Its composition varies with the process and type of coal used – lignite, bituminous or anthracite.

Coal tar is a mixture of approximately 10,000 chemicals, of which only about 50% have been identified.  Most of the chemical compounds are polycyclic aromatic hydrocarbon:

 polycyclic aromatic hydrocarbons (4-rings: chrysene, fluoranthene, pyrene, triphenylene, naphthacene, benzanthracene, 5-rings: picene, benzo[a]pyrene, benzo[e]pyrene, benzofluoranthenes, perylene, 6-rings: dibenzopyrenes, dibenzofluoranthenes, benzoperylenes, 7-rings: coronene)
 methylated and polymethylated derivatives, mono- and polyhydroxylated derivatives, and heterocyclic compounds. 

Others: benzene, toluene, xylenes, cumenes, coumarone, indene, benzofuran, naphthalene and methyl-naphthalenes, acenaphthene, fluorene, phenol, cresols, pyridine, picolines, phenanthracene, carbazole, quinolines, fluoranthene. Many of these constituents are known carcinogens.

Derivatives
Various phenolic coal tar derivatives have analgesic (pain-killer) properties. These included acetanilide, phenacetin, and paracetamol aka acetaminophen. Paracetamol may be the only coal-tar derived analgesic still in use today. Industrial phenol is now usually synthesized from crude oil rather than coal tar.

Coal tar derivatives are contra-indicated for people with the inherited red cell blood disorder glucose-6-phosphate dehydrogenase deficiency (G6PD deficiency), as they can cause oxidative stress leading to red blood cell breakdown.

Society and culture
Coal tar is on the World Health Organization's List of Essential Medicines, the most effective and safe medicines needed in a health system. Coal tar is generally available as a generic medication and over the counter.

Regulation 
Exposure to coal tar pitch volatiles can occur in the workplace by breathing, skin contact, or eye contact. The Occupational Safety and Health Administration (OSHA) has set the permissible exposure limit) to 0.2 mg/m3 benzene-soluble fraction over an 8-hour workday. The National Institute for Occupational Safety and Health (NIOSH) has set a recommended exposure limit (REL) of 0.1 mg/m3 cyclohexane-extractable fraction over an 8-hour workday. At levels of 80 mg/m3, coal tar pitch volatiles are immediately dangerous to life and health.

When used as a medication in the United States, coal tar preparations are considered over-the-counter drug pharmaceuticals and are subject to regulation by the Food and Drug Administration (FDA).

See also 
Coal oil
Wood tar

References

External links 

 
 
 
 

Antipsoriatics
Coal
IARC Group 1 carcinogens
Materials
World Health Organization essential medicines
Wikipedia medicine articles ready to translate